Thomas Van Renssalaer Gibbs (September 16, 1855 – October 31, 1898) was a member of the 1885 Florida Constitutional Convention, served in the Florida House of Representatives, and was a school administrator. He was nominated to West Point by Representative Josiah Walls, who was also African American.

In the legislature, Gibbs helped pass legislation establishing a white normal school in Gainesville, Florida and a "colored school" in Jacksonville. State Normal College for Colored Students was a predecessor of  Florida A&M College and was relocated to Tallahassee where it opened in 1887 with 15 students. Gibbs served as its assistant principal and Vice President until his death in 1898. The only son of Jonathan Clarkson Gibbs, Thomas married Alice Menard, the daughter of politician John Willis Menard who in 1868 was the first African American elected to Congress.

See also
African-American officeholders during and following the Reconstruction era

References

Canter Brown, Jr. Florida's Black Public Officials, 1867-1924. Tuscaloosa and London: The University of Alabama Press, 1998.

African-American state legislators in Florida
1855 births
1898 deaths
Florida A&M University faculty
Republican Party members of the Florida House of Representatives
19th-century American politicians
African-American politicians during the Reconstruction Era